Como los peces is the third studio album of Carlos Varela, released in 1995

Track listing
"Como un ángel" - 4:32
"Pequeños sueños" - 5:56
"Solo tú (puedes traer el Sol)" - 4:35
"Graffiti de amor" - 4:28
"Hombre de silicona" - 5:06
"Foto de familia" - 5:30
"Como los peces" - 5:09
"Grettel" - 4:16
"El niño, los sueños y el reloj de arena" - 5:39
"La política no cabe en la azucarera" - 4:57
"El leñador sin bosque" 4:27
"Habáname" - 3:18

External links

Carlos Varela Official site

1995 albums
Carlos Varela albums